Floyd Lahache (born September 17, 1957) is a Canadian former professional ice hockey player who played in the World Hockey Association (WHA). Drafted in the seventh round of the 1977 NHL amateur draft by the Chicago Black Hawks, Lahache opted to play in the WHA after being selected by the Cincinnati Stingers in the third round of the 1977 WHA Amateur Draft. He played in eleven games for the Stingers during the 1977–78 WHA season. As a youth, he played in the 1969 and 1970 Quebec International Pee-Wee Hockey Tournaments with a minor ice hockey team from Caughnawaga.

Career statistics

Awards
1975–76 QMJHL West Second All-Star Team
1976–77 QMJHL Third All-Star Team

References

External links

1957 births
Binghamton Dusters players
Canadian ice hockey defencemen
Canadian Mohawk people
Chicago Blackhawks draft picks
Cincinnati Stingers draft picks
Cincinnati Stingers players
First Nations sportspeople
Flint Generals players
Hampton Gulls (AHL) players
Ice hockey people from Quebec
Kalamazoo Wings (1974–2000) players
Living people
People from Montérégie
Sherbrooke Castors players
Springfield Indians players
Tucson Rustlers players